The Federated States of Micronesia Football Association or FSMFA is the governing body of football in the Federated States of Micronesia, and of the national team. They are not an associate member of FIFA.

History

1992-1996: Early years 
Football (soccer) has been played in the Federated States of Micronesia informally, and at the school level, for over 20 years. It was not until 1992 that a serious attempt was made to improve the level of organized play in the country, especially among the indigenous populations of the states that make up the Federated States of Micronesia. This was accomplished by the introduction of the sport among people of all ages.

In Pohnpei, a football league was started culminating with periodic statewide tournaments. In Yap, a single club team was started with matches scheduled with teams from visiting ships. In Kosrae, a league especially for younger children was formed.

Three years ago the Federated States of Micronesia was admitted into the Oceania Division of the International Olympic Committee. However, under the charter of the National Olympic Committee, they could not devote any funds to football development until the international governing body for football, namely FIFA, recognizes the program. Consequently, the football programs that have been developed have come about as a result of donations from the private sector in the states, and more recently, through the assistance of the Federated States of Micronesia Football Association.

There are approximately 150 adult players in the Federated States of Micronesia; approximately 500 youth players, three volunteer referees and five amateur coaches. None of the players, coaches or referees are professional. There are no professional clubs in the country. There are amateur club teams that play within three of the four states of the country (Chuuk, Pohnpei and Yap). The fourth state, Kosrae, plays football only in an unorganized fashion.

Owing to the great distance between the four states that make up the Federated States of Micronesia, there has not yet been a competition between clubs from different states. However, the inclusion of football in the 3rd FSM games held in Yap in July 2001 offered the opportunity for the state teams to compete against each other. At present, there are five fields in the country that are of sufficient size and quality that can be used for matches. The two best ones are in Yap. The FSM is fortunate that a sophisticated sports complex was built in Yap for the FSM Games. The complex includes a regulation-size football field, complete with covered stands and lights for night games.

1996-1998: International recognition 
A team from Yap was invited to participate in the Micronesian Games that were held in the Republic of Palau in August 1998. Given that it was their first international event, and that the Yap team were mostly young boys ages 14 – 21, they won two of their six games played. In attendance at the Micronesian Games were two professional FIFA referees, sent to Palau from the Japan Football Association (they had both recently come from attending and participating in the 1998 FIFA World Cup held in France). They encouraged the Federated States of Micronesia to apply for FIFA accreditation.

1999-2003: Formation Of FSMFA 
In January 1999, the Federated States of Micronesia Football Association (FSMFA) was formed. The FSMFA functions to guide all aspects of football development in the country. Its members are state football associations, football clubs and football organizations within the Federated States of Micronesia.

2004-2006: Early FSMFA 
The leadership of the association was invited by FIFA to attend the 52nd Ordinary FIFA Congress in Zurich, Switzerland, held 4–5 August 2000. At the congress, FSMFA and FIFA officials met to discuss the status of the FSMFA's application for membership.  In the meantime, the FSMFA is concentrating on the further development of football in all four FSM states. It hopes to sponsor a training course for coaches as well as referees in the four states. Building upon the recent enthusiasm generated at the FSM Games, plans are underway to initiate the formation of teams for girls and women in Yap, Pohnpei and Chuuk.

In 2006, the FSMFA was recognized as a possible future associate member of the Oceania Football Confederation.

Champions in 2021

Nimgil were crowned champions in 2021.

References

External links
FSMFA official website
FSMFA History Source (Revised: July 12, 2002)

Football in the Federated States of Micronesia
Sports organizations established in 1999
1999 establishments in the Federated States of Micronesia